Labeobarbus gananensis is a species of ray-finned fish in the genus Labeobarbus which is endemic to Ethiopia.

References 

 

gananensis
Taxa named by Decio Vinciguerra
Fish described in 1895